Freudenthal is a German surname. Notable people with the surname include:

Axel Olof Freudenthal (1836–1911), Finland-Swedish philologist and politician
Dave Freudenthal (born 1950), American politician
Franz Freudenthal, Bolivian physician known for several medical inventions
Hans Freudenthal (1905–1990), Dutch mathematician
Heinrich Freudenthal, founder of Deutsche Pentosin-Werke GmbH
Jacob Freudenthal (1839-1907), German philosopher
Karl Freudenthal (died 1944), Nazi lawyer and SS officer
Nancy D. Freudenthal (born 1954), U.S. district judge
Thor Freudenthal (born 1972), American director and screenwriter

See also
Nathan Freudenthal Leopold, Jr. (1904–1971), American criminal
9689 Freudenthal, asteroid
Bruntál, town in the Czech Republic, known in German as Freudenthal
Freudenthal spectral theorem
Freudenthal suspension theorem

German-language surnames
Jewish surnames
Yiddish-language surnames